Iloilo Sports Complex, also known as the Iloilo Sports Center is a multi-use sports complex in La Paz, Iloilo City, Philippines and is the venue of athletic events in Iloilo province and Western Visayas and occasionally hosts large gatherings such as concerts. Its main stadium, the Main Stadium, has a seating capacity of 7,000.

Iloilo Sports Complex includes an Olympic-size swimming pool, an oval running track, a football field, two volleyball courts, two basketball courts, two tennis courts and four badminton courts. An indoor gymnasium is located 200 meters away from the main site.

The athletics track underwent repair in 2014 which costed  though it had to be rehabilitated again due to the number of sporting events hosted by the venue. The sports venue had to be closed in October 2015 for renovation works. The  rehabilitation was completed in December 2015. The athletics track was rubberized and had its lanes painted. The football field also had its grass switched to another type of Bermuda grass.

It hosts the home matches of Iloilo F.A. football team. In February 2018, Kaya Futbol Club adopted the Iloilo Sports Complex as their home venue. Liga Futbol Inc., the organization that manages the Philippines Football League approved the usage of the field for league matches by Kaya on April 20, 2018. The club is set to play their first home league match against Global Cebu on May 2.

Gallery

References 

Athletics (track and field) venues in the Philippines
Football venues in the Philippines
Basketball venues in the Philippines
Buildings and structures in Iloilo City
Swimming venues in the Philippines
Tennis venues in the Philippines
Sports in Iloilo